McAllaster may refer to:

McAllaster, Kansas, an unincorporated community in Logan County, Kansas, United States
Eugene McAllaster (1866–1946), American engineer and naval architect

See also
McAlester (disambiguation)
McAllister (disambiguation)